HMS Swift was a 14-gun Swan-class ship-sloop, launched on 1 January 1777.  She was commissioned that month under Lieutenant George Keppel and sailed for North America on 27 March. Command later passed to Thomas Lennox Frederick, who captained her in operations on the Delaware River. On 22 November 1778, she was in pursuit of an American privateer, Rattlesnake, off Cape Henry in Chesapeake Bay. During the action Swift grounded on Middle Ground and she was burnt by her crew to prevent her from falling into enemy hands. Rattlesnake was wrecked also.

References

 
 Winfield, Rif, British Warships in the Age of Sail 1714-1792: Design, Construction, Careers and Fates. Seaforth Publishing, 2007. .

External links

 

Sloops of the Royal Navy
1777 ships
Swan-class ship-sloops